Compagnie Générale de Banque (Cogebanque), sometimes referred to as Cogebank, is a Rwandan commercial bank. The bank is one of the commercial banks in the Republic of Rwanda, licensed by National Bank of Rwanda, the national banking regulator.

Overview
, the bank's total assets were valued in excess of US$192.2 million (RWF:134 billion), with shareholders' equity valued at US$19.65 million (RWF:13.7 billion).

History
Cogebanque was established in July 1999 by forty-two private Rwandan investors. At that time, the insurance company Compagnie Générale d'Assurance et de Reassurance, was the largest shareholder, with 34% ownership. In the beginning, the bank's emphasis was Small and Medium Enterprises (SMEs), agriculture and the service industries. In 2008, three new international investors paid US$6 million for a 40% ownership in the bank. The new investors included: (a) ShoreCap International (SCI) of Chicago, Illinois, United States; (b) the Belgian Investment Company for Developing Countries (BIO) and (c) AfricaInvest, an investment company based in Tunisia. These transactions, initiated in 2008, were concluded in early 2010. The original Rwandan investors maintain a 60% shareholding in the restructured bank.

Branch network
As of March 2015, Cogebanque maintained branches at the following locations:

 Cogebanque Headquarters – Centenary House, KN 4 Avenue, Kigali
 Rond-Point Branch – BIB Trading Building, KN 1 Round About, Kigali
 Rubangura Branch – Rubangura House, KN 2 Street, Kigali
 Nyabugogo Branch – Chez Manu Building, KN 1 Road, Kigali
 Nyarutarama Branch – MTN Centre, KG 9 Avenue, Kigali 
 Gisozi Branch – Companion House, KG 33 Avenue, Gisozi, Kigali 
 Remera Branch – Nyiransengimana Justine Building, KG 11 Avenue, Kigali
 Kicukiro Branch – Inind House, Kigali
 Rwamagana Branch – Rusirare Jacques Building , Rwamagana, Eastern Rwanda
 Kabarondo Branch – Cogebanque Building, Kabarondo , Eastern Rwanda 
 Huye Branch – Bihira Juvenal Building, Butare, Huye District, Southern Rwanda
 Nyamagabe Branch – Kanimba Building, Nyamagabe, Southern Rwanda
 Muhanga Branch – Mukantabana Speciose Building, Gitarama, Southern Rwanda 
 Musanze Branch – Economat Diocese Building, Ruhengeri, Northern Rwanda
 Rubavu Branch – Munyandekwe Issa Building, Rubavu, Western Rwanda
 Kamembe Branch – Twizeyimana Vincent Building, Kamembe, Western Rwanda
 Tyazo Branch – Kagorora Jacques Building, Tyazo, Southern Rwanda 
 Nyagatare Branch – Karangwa House, Eastern Rwanda
 Prestige Banking Branch – Centenary House, Kigali.

See also

 List of banks in Rwanda
 Economy of Rwanda

References

External links
 Overview of the Beginnings of Cogebanque

Banks of Rwanda
Banks established in 1999
1999 establishments in Rwanda
Organisations based in Kigali
Economy of Kigali